General Kadir Andarabi was one of the top commanders of Ahmed Shah Massoud's Jamiat-e Islami during the Civil War in Afghanistan. He was reported to have been involved in the Afshar Operation.

Following the fall of the Taliban Kabir Andarabi was a senior ministry of defense commander stationed in Bagrami District, until mid-2005. Following this he worked as a police official in the ministry of interior. The Chief of Police for Baghlan Province is currently Mohammad Kabir Andarabi however it is unclear if they are the same person.

References

Living people
Year of birth missing (living people)